Sugar is a free and open-source desktop environment designed for interactive learning by children. Copyright by SugarLabs. Developed as part of the One Laptop per Child (OLPC) project, Sugar was the default interface on OLPC XO-1 laptop computers. The OLPC XO-1.5 and later provided the option of either the Gnome or Sugar interfaces.

Sugar is available as a Live CD, as Live USB, and a package installable through several Linux distributions.

Unlike most other desktop environments, Sugar does not use the "desktop", "folder" and "window" metaphors. Instead, Sugar's default full-screen activities require users to focus on only one program at a time. Sugar implements a journal which automatically saves the user's running program session and allows them to later use an interface to pull up their past works by date, an activity used, or file type.

Design principles
Sugar has the objective of being suitable for even inexperienced users but provides more advanced facilities for the more experienced. The project's stated goal is to "avoid bloated interfaces", and "limit the controls to those immediately relevant to the task at hand.". Applications run full screen, double-clicking is not used, and menus show icons.

Sugar is written in Python, an interpreted language, and can be modified by users with programming experience. Desktop environments used by many operating systems are written in compiled languages such as  C.

Software components 

Applications developed by Sugar Labs are very pragmatic which offers several opportunities to avail which enhances the skills and makes them dexterous in their field. Sugar Activities include Turtle Blocks 3D, Ruler, Recall and many more.

Hundreds of learning activities for Sugar can be downloaded from the Sugar Activity Library. Additional activities are available from third parties, such as the Project Ceibal portal in Uruguay.

History
In May 2006 Sugar's developers described it as primarily a "tool for expression," and plans were in place to include multimedia and social networking features.

Since May 2008 Sugar has been developed under the umbrella of Sugar Labs, a member project of the Software Freedom Conservancy. Some contributors are employed by One Laptop per Child and other related organizations, others are volunteers, in many cases associated with the free software community. Contributors to the original Sugar platform included Marco Pesenti Gritti, Walter Bender, Christopher Blizzard, Eben Eliason, Simon Schampijer, Christian Schmidt, Lisa Strausfeld, Takaaki Okada, Tomeu Vizoso, and Dan Williams.

Cross-platform
By early 2007 Sugar could be installed, with some difficulty, on several Linux distributions, and in virtual machines on other operating systems. By mid-2008 Sugar was available on the Debian, Ubuntu, and Fedora distributions of Linux; e.g., as of Ubuntu 8.04 (Hardy Heron), Sugar could be installed from the official Ubuntu universe repositories. By mid-2009 Sugar was also available on openSUSE and other Linux distributions. Sugar 0.82.1 was included in the OLPC system software release 8.2.0 for XO-1 laptops. Sugar 0.86 was released on September 30, 2009. Sugar 0.88 was released on March 31, 2010. Sugar 0.90.0 was released in October, 2010. There were three releases in 2011 and one in June 2012, which included support for the ARM architecture on the XO 1.75. Builds for OLPC XO laptops and the release schedule are available at OS releases. Sugar has been ported to run on Android, Firefox OS and iOS using HTML5 and JavaScript under the project name "Sugarizer"; with additional clients written for Web browsers supporting HTML5.

Sugar on a Stick
The Sugar learning platform for Linux is available as a USB-bootable Linux distribution ("Sugar on a Stick" also known as "SoaS") and as software components forming an installable additional desktop environment for most Linux distributions. It can be installed using the Fedora Live USB Creator, and can be installed onto a computer hard disk using the liveinst command from a Sugar Terminal or console.

On June 23, 2009, Sugar Labs announced the availability for download of Sugar on a Stick v1 Strawberry, which can run from a bootable 1 GB USB flash drive. On July 23, 2009, Recycle USB.com went live with a program to reflash used USB keys with the Sugar software and donate them to schools. On December 8, 2009, Sugar Labs announced the availability of Sugar on a Stick v2 Blueberry, which incorporates Sugar Release 0.86 and Fedora 11. Sugar Labs announced the availability of Sugar on a Stick v3 Mirabelle, which incorporates Sugar Release 0.88 and Fedora 13. Since Mirabelle, Sugar on a Stick has been a regular, semi-annual, Fedora Spin (official special-purpose version of Fedora); the a Spin using Fedora v22 was released on 26 May 2015.

XO-1 Usage 
The OLPC XO-1 has a 1 GB NAND flash drive and 256 MB of memory. Because the flash-based hard drive is small, swap can only be added by using an SD card or a network block device.

If too many activities are loaded at the same time there may be performance problems due to low memory or processor load.

Releases

XO releases 
Sugar has had many XO releases.

Raspberry Pi releases 
Sugar can be run on a Raspberry Pi. It is recommended to use SOAS to run Sugar on one. You can learn how to run Sugar on a Raspberry Pi on Sugar Lab's website.

Sugar on a Stick releases

Strawberry 
The Sugar on a Stick Strawberry release is based on Fedora 11 with the latest updates as of June 22, 2009. It features a Sugar learning environment, namely version 0.84, including 40 Activities to enrich the learning experience. Hundreds of Activities are available for download from the Sugar activity library. This release includes Fedora updates, Sugar features like View Source and file transfer, supplementary sample content, which is available in the Journal, and usability improvements.

Blueberry 
Sugar on a Stick v2 Blueberry was released on 8 December 2009. It is based on F12 version of the Fedora operating system. It contains many features that improve the overall user and learning experience. Here is an overview of the most notable ones:
 Sugar on a stick v2 Blueberry ships Sugar release, 0.86.3. Its features are:
 Redesigned toolbars
 Better Gnash support for Adobe Flash content
 Improved wireless networking
 Support for tabbed browsing
 EPUB file support for e-books
 Easier keyboard-configuration
 Easy way to update to the latest activities
 ZyX-LiveInstaller:
 In high demand was a software to install Sugar to a hard disk. Hence Sugar teamed up the zyx-liveinstaller developer to provide:
 Seamless installation of the personalized environment into your computer's hard disk;
 It saves changes made to Sugar;
 It does not require boot again and again.
 Activities
 It includes updates to the standard collection of Activities for children and many new ones. An example is TamTam activity suite, which takes the user on a journey through Sound and Music.

Mirabelle 
Mirabelle was the 3rd release of the Sugar on a Stick project. It was released on 25 May 2010.
 Sugar version 0.88 features:
 Support for 3G connections
 Increased accessibility
 Better integration with activity portal
 Sugar on a Stick is now a Fedora spin. After two prior releases of being based on Fedora Distribution, Sugar on a Stick has been recognized by Fedora Project as an official Spin. This ties us more closely to Fedora's release cycle and gives us resources from their engineering and marketing teams, which extends the reach of Sugar on a Stick and makes the project itself more sustainable. In exchange, users of Fedora have access to an easily deployable implementation of the Sugar Platform; it's a great example of a mutually beneficial upstream-downstream relationship.
 Contributing to Sugar on a Stick – The biggest difference in v3 has been in its release processes and engineering sustainability;

Mango Lassi 
Mango Lassi was the 4th version of Sugar on a Stick released on 2 November 2010. It uses the Sugar version 0.90.

Coconut 
It is the 5th version of Sugar on a Stick released on 9 October 2011. It uses a Sugar version 0.92.

Pineapple 
It is the 6th version of Sugar on a Stick released on 8 November 2011. It uses a Sugar version 0.94.1.

Quadong 
It is the 7th version of Sugar on a Stick released on 29 May 2012. It uses a Sugar version 0.96.1.

ʻŌhelo ʻai 
It is the 8th version of Sugar on a Stick released on 15 January 2013. It uses a sugar version 0.98.2.

Avocado 
It is the 9th version of Sugar on a Stick released on 2 July 2013. It uses a Sugar version 0.98.8.

10 
It is the 10th version of Sugar on a Stick released on 17 December 2013. It uses a Sugar version 0.100.0.

Later versions 
Sugar has stopped giving official names to SoaS releases, however, it continues to create new versions for each Fedora release. The latest version of Sugar is 0.112. Sugar has released its latest versions for the latest Fedoras: Fedora 23, Fedora 24, Fedora 25, Fedora 26, and Fedora 27.

Sugar on Various Operating Systems 
Sugar is available preinstalled on several Linux operating systems and among the most notable ones:

Fedora Spin SoaS

An edition of Fedora with Sugar. It is also officially featured by The Sugar Project's Wiki on its Sugar on a Stick (SoaS) web page..

Trisquel Sugar Toast

An official edition of Trisquel GNU/Linux with Sugar. It is recommended by The Sugar Project as per 2020.

Screenshots

Sugarizer 
Sugarizer is an HTML and JavaScript based application that allows for using Sugar functionality on any device. It is available as both a web application and a mobile app. It offers a similar user interface and includes features of Sugar Core (datastore and journal), as well as many of the same Sugar activities.

See also

 Educational software
 Linux

References

  Some material was copied from wiki.sugarlabs.org, which is available under a Attribution 3.0 Unported (CC BY 3.0) license.

External links

 
 Sugar-on-a-Stick operating system
 Sugar for Raspberry Pi
 XO releases
 Sugarizer

Desktop environments based on GTK
Educational operating systems
Free and open-source Android software
Free desktop environments
IOS software
Live USB
One Laptop per Child
Linux-based devices